National Highway 702C, commonly referred to as NH 702C is a national highway in  India. It is a spur road of National Highway 2. NH-702C traverses the state of Assam in India.

Route 
Sibsagar, Simaluguri, Sonari.

Junctions  

  Terminal near Sibsagar.
  near Sonari.

See also 

 List of National Highways in India
 List of National Highways in India by state

References

External links 

 NH 702C on OpenStreetMap

National highways in India
National Highways in Assam
Transport in Sibsagar